The Copperhead is a 1920 American silent historical drama film based on a novel by Frederick Landis and a 1918 play by Augustus Thomas. The star of this film is Lionel Barrymore who won acclaim in the play version on Broadway, and who appeared in the play and this film with his first wife Doris Rankin. A print of this film has been screened in recent years.

Plot
At the beginning of the American Civil War Milt Shanks, who owns a farm in Illinois, is asked by President Abraham Lincoln to join the Copperheads, a clandestine quasi-political organization whose sentiments lie with the South.  His family and friends unknowing of his mission call him a traitor.

His son later dies in a Civil War battle and his wife dies of heartbreak over the son's death. Shanks spends decades keeping silent about his involvement with the Copperheads until his granddaughter prepares to marry and he's forced to come clean about being involved in a secret Civil War Mission. With this understanding friends and family forgive him.

Cast

Lionel Barrymore as Milt Shanks
William P. Carleton as Lt. Tom Hardy
Francis Joyner as Newt Gillespie (billed as Frank Joyner)
Richard Carlyle as Lem Tollard
Arthur Rankin as Joey
Leslie Stowe as Brother Andrew
Nicholas Schroell as Abraham Lincoln
William David as Tom Hardy
Harry Bartlett as Dr. James
Jack Ridgeway as Theodore Roosevelt
Mayor N.M. Cartmell as Captain Mercer
Doris Rankin as Mrs. Shanks
Carolyn Lee as Grandma Perley
Anne Cornwall as Madeline
Francis Haldorn as Elsie

Preservation
The film survives. It is available on DVD from at least one online source.

See also
Lionel Barrymore filmography

References

External links

lantern slide/coming attraction; "The Copperhead" w/Lionel Barrymore
from Italian-Wikipedia, Lionel Barrymore in the 1918 play The Copperhead

1920s historical drama films
American historical drama films
American silent feature films
1920 films
Films directed by Charles Maigne
Films based on American novels
American films based on plays
Paramount Pictures films
American Civil War films
Fictional depictions of Abraham Lincoln in film
American black-and-white films
Films based on adaptations
1920 drama films
Surviving American silent films
1920s American films
Silent American drama films